Puxin station is a railway station on the Taiwan Railways Administration West Coast line located in Yangmei District, Taoyuan City, Taiwan.

History
The station was opened in 1900 as Anpinzhen (Hetin) station (安平鎮招呼站). It changed its name to the current name on 1 March 1955. The station building on the south entrance was built on 31 January 1986 and an expansion on the north entrance was completed on 9 December 2002. It is only served by local trains. The station building caught fire on 5 May 2016, and the fire damage was repaired by August 2016.

Around the station
 Kuo Yuan Ye Museum of Cake and Pastry (2500 meters northwest of the station)
 Puxin Night Market (next to the station)
 Puxin Ranch (1300 meters northwest of the station)

See also
 List of railway stations in Taiwan

References

1900 establishments in Taiwan
Railway stations in Taoyuan City
Railway stations opened in 1900
Railway stations served by Taiwan Railways Administration